Visitors to Panama require a visa unless they are eligible for Third-Country visa exemptions for stays up to 30 days by either possessing a valid visitor (used at least once for entry) or resident visa for any of the following nations: UK, USA, Canada, the EU, Australia, Japan, Singapore, South Korea; or if they are citizens of one of the eligible countries who do not require a visa for stays up to 90 days; up to 180 days for visitors who are citizens of the United States or Canada. All visitors must hold a passport valid for at least 3 months before expiry date.

On December 28, 2016, President Juan Carlos Varela decreed that the immigration authorities of the National Immigration Service will issue tourist visas valid for a term not greater than 90 days (three months); however, it was later clarified that did not change the situation for those who can enter visa-free for 180 days.

However, on September 1, 2021, the Servicio Nacional de Migración de Panamá informed that foreign citizens visiting Panamá are now allowed a maximum stay of ninety (90) days for those who can enter visa-free per Res. 22068, however citizens of the United States or Canada are still allowed a maximum stay of one hundred eighty (180) days visa-free per Res. 22706 published on September 10, 2021, citing reciprocity.

Visa policy map

Visa exemption 

Holders of passports of the following 118 jurisdictions do not require a visa to visit Panama:

Notes
 Including holders of U.S. Re-entry Permit (form I-327) and Employment Authorization Card (form I-766) with the remark "Valid for re-entry to the U.S." or "Serves as I-512 advance parole"
 Nations qualified for simplified permanent residency program.

In addition, all passengers with a national ID card or a birth certificate issued by Panama do not need a visa, regardless of passports they use to travel.

Third-country visas or residence documents
As per Executive Decree 521, signed by President Varela on 6 August 2018, nationalities who normally need to apply for a Panamanian visa will be allowed visa-free entry for thirty (30) days if they hold a multiple-entry visa valid for at least 6 months at the time of entry, or permanent residency documents issued by any of the following countries:

Panama Friendly Nations Visa

In 2012, the Government of Panama launched the Friendly Nations Visa. The visa is open to the citizens of fifty countries deemed to have positive diplomatic and economic ties to Panama. To qualify, the citizens of those countries must present professional or economic ties to Panama. Once the applicant demonstrates those ties, they are eligible for permanent residency and a work permit in Panama. After three to five years, holders of this visa can apply for Panamanian citizenship.

Transit without a Visa
Nationals of  require a visa at all times, including for transit. Other countries may transit in Panama without a visa for 12 hours if they have a confirmed onward ticket.

Visitor statistics
Most visitors arriving to Panama via Tocumen International Airport were from the following countries of nationality:

See also

Visa requirements for Panamanian citizens
List of diplomatic missions of Panama

References

Panama
Foreign relations of Panama